Donal "Dony" MacManus is an Irish sculptor and educator.

MacManus graduated with a degree from the National College of Art and Design in Dublin, as well as an Art Teaching Diploma. He worked as a teacher in St. David's, Artane, Dublin. He studied in New York Academy of Art gaining a Masters. He has a number of sculptures on display in New York and Washington D.C.

MacManus returned to Ireland in 2004 and founded Irish Academy of Figurative Art, in Ranelagh in Dublin.

In 2011 MacManus co-founded the Sacred Art School, in Florence, Italy. He is also a board member of Newman College Ireland.

Works

 The Linesman (1999), Dublin Docklands
 St Josemaría Escrivá (2000), bronze for the Catholic Information Center, Washington D.C.
 Hobey Baker (2001), cast bronze, St. Paul's School, New Hampshire. U.S.A.
 St Joseph and the Child Jesus (2002), bronze for the Catholic Information Center, Washington D.C.
 Cardinal Newman (2004), Catholic Information Center, Washington D.C.
 St Joseph and the Child Jesus (2007) cast bronze, Tallahassee, Florida.
 The Game Piece, originally on N4, moved to Jail Park, Mullingar, Co. Westmeath. 
 Theology of the Body Sculpture
 Archbishop Fulton Sheen (2016), Saint Malachy's Roman Catholic Church, New York.
 Bishop William O'Higgins St. Mary's Church, Drumlish, Co. Longford, 2020.

References

1971 births
Irish sculptors
Alumni of the National College of Art and Design
New York Academy of Art alumni
People from County Dublin
Living people